John William III, Duke of Saxe-Eisenach (17 October 1666 – 14 January 1729), was a duke of Saxe-Eisenach, and came from the Ernestine line of the House of Wettin.

Life

John William III was born in Friedewald, the third son of John George I, Duke of Saxe-Eisenach and Johannetta of Sayn-Wittgenstein. His twin brother, Maximilian, died at the age of two.

He succeeded his brother John George II as duke of Saxe-Eisenach when he died childless in 1698. John William III was crowned duke of Saxe-Eisenach. Saxe-Eisenach experienced a cultural boon under his reign, which was in no small part due to the duke's court band, whose most prominent member was Georg Philipp Telemann.

Family

In Oranjewoud on 28 November 1690, John William married with Amalie (The Hague, 25 November 1655 – Allstedt, 16 February 1695), a daughter of William Frederick, Prince of Nassau-Dietz. They had two children:
Wilhelm Heinrich, Duke of Saxe-Eisenach (b. Oranjewoud, 10 November 1691 – d. Eisenach, 26 July 1741).
Albertine Johannetta (b. Oranjewoud, 28 February 1693 – d. Eisenach, 1 April 1700).

In Wolfenbüttel on 27 February 1697 — two years of the death of his first wife — John William married secondly with Christine Juliane of Baden-Durlach, a daughter of Charles Gustav of Baden-Durlach. They had seven children:
Johannette Antoinette Juliane (b. Jena, 31 January 1698 – d. Schloss Dahme, 13 April 1726), married on 9 May 1721 to Duke Johann Adolf II of Saxe-Weissenfels.
Karoline Christine (b. Jena, 15 April 1699 – d. Philippsthal, 25 July 1743), married on 24 November 1725 to Landgrave Charles I of Hesse-Philippsthal.
Anton Gustav (b. Eisenach, 12 August 1700 – d. Eisenach, 4 October 1710).
Charlotte Wilhelmine Juliane (b. Eisenach, 27 June 1703 – d. Erfurt, 17 August 1774).
Johannetta Wilhelmine Juliane (b. Eisenach, 10 September 1704 – d. Eisenach, 3 January 1705).
Karl Wilhelm (b. Eisenach, 9 January 1706 – d. Eisenach, 24 February 1706).
Karl August (b. Eisenach, 10 June 1707 – d. Eisenach, 22 February 1711).

In Weissenfels on 28 July 1708 — one year after the death of his second wife — John William married thirdly with Magdalene Sibylle of Saxe-Weissenfels, a daughter of Johann Adolf I, Duke of Saxe-Weissenfels. They had three children:
Johanna Magdalene Sophie (b. Eisenach, 19 August 1710 – d. Eisenach, 26 February 1711).
Christiane Wilhelmine (b. Altenkirchen, 3 September 1711 – d. Idstein, 27 November 1740), married on 26 November 1734 to Prince Charles of Nassau-Usingen.
Johann Wilhelm (b. Marksuhl, 28 January 1713 – d. Eisenach, 8 May 1713).

In the Schloss Philippsruhe on 29 May 1727 — one year after the death of his third wife — John William married fourthly with Marie Christine Felizitas of Leiningen-Dagsburg-Falkenburg-Heidesheim, Dowager Princess of Baden-Durlach. This union was childless. John William died at Eisenach.

References

House of Wettin
1666 births
1729 deaths
People from Altenkirchen (district)
Dukes of Saxe-Eisenach